San Mango d'Aquino is a town and comune in the province of Catanzaro, in the Calabria region of southern Italy. This town was recently rejuvenated by several construction programs designed to improve access for tourism.
 
The town is bordered by Cleto, Martirano Lombardo and Nocera Terinese.

See also
 Savuto river

References 

Cities and towns in Calabria